The 1969 French Grand Prix was a Formula One motor race held at the Charade Circuit on 6 July 1969. It was race 5 of 11 in both the 1969 World Championship of Drivers and the 1969 International Cup for Formula One Manufacturers. There were only thirteen entries for this Grand Prix. The 38-lap race was won by Matra driver Jackie Stewart after he started from pole position. His teammate Jean-Pierre Beltoise finished second and Brabham driver Jacky Ickx came in third.

Classification

Qualifying

Race

Championship standings after the race

Drivers' Championship standings

Constructors' Championship standings

Note: Only the top five positions are included for both sets of standings.

References

Further reading

French Grand Prix
French Grand Prix
1969 in French motorsport